Lake Hamilton is a town in Polk County, Florida, United States. The population was 1,231 at the 2010 census. As of 2018, the population recorded by the U.S. Census Bureau is 1,442. It is part of the Lakeland–Winter Haven Metropolitan Statistical Area. From 1964 through the 1970s, Hurricane Aircats, military airboats used by the US Army in Vietnam, were manufactured in Lake Hamilton. The airboats were made by Hurricane Fiberglass Products Company, an airboat and fiberglass manufacturer based in the neighboring town of Auburndale.

Geography

Lake Hamilton is located in the humid subtropical zone of (Köppen climate classification: Cfa).

The dominant geographic feature in the city is the large lake after which the city is named. Lake Hamilton is part of the Chain of Lakes.

Demographics

At the 2000 census there were 1,304 people, 482 households, and 362 families in the town. The racial makeup of the town was 71.09% White, 25.15% African American, 0.46% Native American, 0.31% Asian, 0.08% Pacific Islander, 2.30% from other races, and 0.61% from two or more races. Hispanic or Latino of any race were 5.06%.

Of the 482 households 31.5% had children under the age of 18 living with them, 55.6% were married couples living together, 17.2% had a female householder with no husband present, and 24.7% were non-families. 21.0% of households were one person and 8.5% were one person aged 65 or older.  The average household size was 2.67 and the average family size was 3.09.

The age distribution was 27.1% under the age of 18, 6.6% from 18 to 24, 26.4% from 25 to 44, 25.1% from 45 to 64, and 14.8% 65 or older.  The median age was 39 years. For every 100 females, there were 92.0 males.  For every 100 females age 18 and over, there were 85.5 males.

The median household income was $33,438 and the median family income  was $38,050. Males had a median income of $28,281 versus $21,833 for females. The per capita income for the town was $16,199.  About 13.3% of families and 21.5% of the population were below the poverty line, including 40.5% of those under age 18 and 5.6% of those age 65 or over.

Transportation

 State Road 17 – The Scenic Highway going through the center of town, paralleling US 27 and leading southward to downtown Dundee and Lake Wales
 US 27 – Located just west of town, this divided highway leads to Lake Wales and Haines City.

References

External links 

Lake Hamilton Town website

Towns in Polk County, Florida
Towns in Florida
Hamilton